The 2016 United States presidential election in West Virginia was held on November 8, 2016, as part of the 2016 General Election in which all 50 states plus the District of Columbia participated. West Virginia voters chose electors to represent them in the Electoral College via a popular vote pitting the Republican Party's nominee, businessman Donald Trump, and running mate Indiana Governor Mike Pence against Democratic Party nominee, former Secretary of State Hillary Clinton and her running mate, Virginia Senator Tim Kaine.

On May 10, 2016, in the presidential primaries, West Virginia  voters expressed their preferences for the Democratic, Republican, Green, and Libertarian parties' respective nominees for president. Registered members of each party only voted in their party's primary, while voters who were unaffiliated chose any one primary in which to vote.

Donald Trump won West Virginia with 68.5% of the vote, his largest share of the vote in any state.  Hillary Clinton received just over a quarter of the vote, with 26.4%. Trump's performance in the state made it his strongest state in the 2016 election by total vote share.

West Virginia was also one of two states where Donald Trump won every county, the other being Oklahoma. This was the second consecutive presidential election where every county within the state voted Republican. Trump's 42.2% margin of victory is the largest of any presidential candidate from either party in the state's 
history, besting Abraham Lincoln's 36.4% margin of victory in 1864. Hillary Clinton's performance was the worst by a major party nominee since 1912, when three candidates split the vote and received over 20% of the vote each, and, as of the 2020 election, remains the worst performance ever by a Democrat in West Virginia.

Primary elections

Democratic primary 

Six candidates appeared on the Democratic presidential primary ballot:
(alphabetically)
Hillary Clinton
Rocky De La Fuente
Paul T. Farrell Jr.
Martin O'Malley (withdrawn)
Keith Judd
Bernie Sanders

Republican primary 

Eleven candidates appeared on the Republican presidential primary ballot:
Jeb Bush (withdrawn)
Ben Carson (withdrawn)
Chris Christie (withdrawn)
Ted Cruz (withdrawn)
Carly Fiorina (withdrawn)
Mike Huckabee (withdrawn)
John Kasich (withdrawn)
Rand Paul (withdrawn)
Marco Rubio (withdrawn)
Donald Trump

General election

Predictions

Statewide results

By congressional district
Trump won all three congressional districts.

By county

Polling

Analysis 
As expected, Republican nominee Donald Trump won West Virginia in a 42-point rout (the largest of any presidential candidate in the state's history) over Democratic nominee Hillary Clinton, thanks to ardent support from coal industry workers in Appalachia. He thus captured all five electoral votes from the Mountain State. Trump had promised to bring back mining jobs in economically depressed areas of coal country, whereas his opponent had proposed investing millions into converting the region to a producer of green energy. Democrats' championing of environmentalism is viewed as a threat in coal country, and Clinton faced a towering rejection from Mountain State voters. Clinton was also seen as being "haunted" by a comment she made within the state itself, in which in describing the transition to clean energy she stated "We’re going to put a lot of coal miners and coal companies out of business."

West Virginia was once a solidly Democratic state; it voted Democratic in every election from 1932 to 1996, except for the Republican landslides of 1956, 1972, and 1984. However, in recent years it has drifted to becoming solidly Republican, and has stayed that way since it was won by George W. Bush in 2000. Barack Obama, for example, failed to win even a single county in 2012. West Virginia is one of the two states where Hillary Clinton did not win any counties, the other being Oklahoma, which last voted for a Democrat in 1964.

See also 
Democratic Party presidential debates, 2016
Democratic Party presidential primaries, 2016
Republican Party presidential debates, 2016
Republican Party presidential primaries, 2016

References

WVA
2016
Presidential